The Indispensable Enemy: Labor and the Anti-Chinese Movement in California is a 1975 labor and California history book by Alexander Saxton  which became one of the founding texts of Asian American studies.  The book has been described as "represent[ing] the best example of writing in the historical materialist tradition within Asian American Studies" and "[t]he model of historical writing" that discusses both the "history of workers and racism", both interracial "unity but also the limits of that unity."

Notes

Further reading
 Alexander Saxton, "The Indispensable Enemy and Ideological Construction: Reminiscences of an Octogenarian Radical", Amerasia Journal, v.26, n.1, pp. 86–101 (2000).
 R. W. Rydell, "Grand Crossings: The Life and Work of Alexander Saxton", Pacific Historical Review (2004)

1971 non-fiction books
1974 books
Anti-Chinese sentiment in the United States
Chinese-American culture in California
History books about the United States
Asian-American history of California
American studies
Asian studies
Social history of California
Labor history of California
Historiography of California
History of racism in California
Books about labour